Thomas Eccleston Gibb (1838 – 6 June 1894) was an English Liberal politician who sat in the House of Commons from 1885 to 1886.

Gibb was born at Liverpool. He was clerk of Guardians and Vestry Clerk of St. Pancras.

In the 1885 general election, Gibb was elected Member of Parliament for St Pancras East but lost the seat in the 1886 general election.

Gibb lived at Bushey, Hertfordshire, and  died at the age of 55

Gibb married Mary Humphrey of Shoreditch.

References

1838 births
1894 deaths
Liberal Party (UK) MPs for English constituencies
UK MPs 1885–1886
Members of London County Council
Politicians from Liverpool